Nottertal-Heilinger Höhen is a town in the Unstrut-Hainich-Kreis district, in Thuringia, Germany. It was created with effect from 31 December 2019 by the merger of the former municipalities of Schlotheim, Bothenheilingen, Issersheilingen, Kleinwelsbach, Neunheilingen and Obermehler. It takes its name from the river Notter, that flows through the municipality, and the Heilingen hills.

References

Unstrut-Hainich-Kreis